A masked ball is a social event attended by participants wearing masks.

The term may also refer to:
A Masked Ball, a Verdi opera
Masked Ball, a 1918 Hungarian film
The Masked Ball, an American play
"Masked Ball" (Twin Peaks episode)